Androglossini is a tribe of birds belonging to the family Psittacidae, whose members inhabit the Neotropical region. It is one of the two tribes of the subfamily Arinae, next to Arini.

Systematics

References

 
Psittacidae